Marhemetabad may refer to:
 Marhemetabad District
Marhemetabad-e Jonubi Rural District
Marhemetabad-e Miyani Rural District
Marhemetabad-e Shomali Rural District